When the Cat's Away is the debut live album from New Zealand female vocal group, When the Cat's Away.

Background and release 
When the Cat's Away formed by four female singers at the 1985 New Zealand Music Awards. The group began performing in September 1986 and signed with CBS Records. In May 1987, the group began a 30-date tour across New Zealand. A performance at His Majesty’s Theatre in Auckland was recorded and the album was released in June 1987.

Track listing

Personnel 
 Ross McDermott – bass
 Wayne Bell – drums
 Gary Verberne – guitar
 Steve Larkins – keyboard
 Jay Foulkes – percussion
 Chris Green – saxophone
 Mike Russell – trumpet

Charts

Certifications

References 

CBS Records albums
1987 live albums
Live albums by New Zealand artists